Eugene "Cyclone" Hart (born June 16, 1951) was an American middleweight boxer who fought from 1969 to 1982.  Hart never fought for the title and could not get a victory against the upper echelon fighters he faced.  His best showing against a top notch fighter was when he fought "Bad" Bennie Briscoe to a 10 round draw on November 18, 1975. Unfortunately he was stopped in one round by Briscoe in their rematch on April 6, 1976.  Another big win for Hart was the 10 round decision he earned over former Olympic champion Sugar Ray Seales on August 15, 1975.

Hart faced three future champions in his career.  He suffered a 9 round TKO loss at the hands of future middleweight champion Marvin Hagler on September 14, 1976.  Future light heavyweight champion Eddie Mustafa Muhammad knocked Hart out in the fourth round on August 26, 1974, and future middleweight king Vito Antuofermo KOed Hart in the fifth round of their March 11, 1977 match.  The Antuofermo fight was typical of Hart's inability to get by championship caliber fighters.  Hart came out throwing powerful left hooks to the head and body of Antuofermo.  Some of Hart's left hooks actually lifted Antuofermo off the ground.  When Antuofermo didn't wilt under the furious attack, Hart lost confidence and the tide of battle turned.  Appearing completely spent, Hart became defenseless and was knocked out.

Hart was trained by legendary boxing figure Cus D'Amato for a short period in 1973 and 1974, but another veteran, Sam Solomon, trained him before and after D'Amato.  Hart never realized his great potential.  Nevertheless, in 2003 Hart was named to the Ring Magazine's list of 100 greatest punchers of all time.  His son is professional fighter Jesse Hart.

Professional boxing record

|-
|align="center" colspan=8|30 Wins (28 knockouts, 2 decisions), 9 Losses (8 knockouts, 1 decision), 1 Draw, 1 No Contest 
|-
| align="center" style="border-style: none none solid solid; background: #e3e3e3"|Result
| align="center" style="border-style: none none solid solid; background: #e3e3e3"|Record
| align="center" style="border-style: none none solid solid; background: #e3e3e3"|Opponent
| align="center" style="border-style: none none solid solid; background: #e3e3e3"|Type
| align="center" style="border-style: none none solid solid; background: #e3e3e3"|Round
| align="center" style="border-style: none none solid solid; background: #e3e3e3"|Date
| align="center" style="border-style: none none solid solid; background: #e3e3e3"|Location
| align="center" style="border-style: none none solid solid; background: #e3e3e3"|Notes
|-align=center
|Loss
|
|align=left| Tony Suero
|KO
|4
|09/02/1982
|align=left| Tropicana Hotel & Casino, Atlantic City, New Jersey, United States
|align=left|
|-
|Loss
|
|align=left| Vito Antuofermo
|KO
|5
|11/03/1977
|align=left| Philadelphia Arena, Philadelphia, Pennsylvania, United States
|align=left|
|-
|Loss
|
|align=left| Marvin Hagler
|RTD
|8
|14/09/1976
|align=left| Philadelphia Spectrum, Philadelphia, Pennsylvania, United States
|align=left|
|-
|Win
|
|align=left| Matt "Art" Donovan
|KO
|2
|11/08/1976
|align=left| Wagner Ballroom, Philadelphia, Pennsylvania, United States
|align=left|
|-
|Loss
|
|align=left| Bennie Briscoe
|KO
|1
|06/04/1976
|align=left| Philadelphia Spectrum, Philadelphia, Pennsylvania, United States
|align=left|
|-
|Win
|
|align=left| Melvin Dennis
|KO
|3
|10/02/1976
|align=left| Philadelphia Spectrum, Philadelphia, Pennsylvania, United States
|align=left|
|-
|Draw
|
|align=left| Bennie Briscoe
|PTS
|10
|18/11/1975
|align=left| Philadelphia Spectrum, Philadelphia, Pennsylvania, United States
|align=left|
|-
|Win
|
|align=left| Sugar Ray Seales
|PTS
|10
|15/08/1975
|align=left| Boardwalk Hall, Atlantic City, New Jersey, United States
|align=left|
|-
|Win
|
|align=left| Chucho Garcia
|TKO
|6
|02/06/1975
|align=left| Philadelphia Arena, Philadelphia, Pennsylvania, United States
|align=left|
|-
|Win
|
|align=left| Mario Rosa
|KO
|4
|28/04/1975
|align=left| Philadelphia Arena, Philadelphia, Pennsylvania, United States
|align=left|
|-
|Win
|
|align=left| Radames Cabrera
|KO
|8
|31/01/1975
|align=left| Philadelphia Arena, Philadelphia, Pennsylvania, United States
|align=left|
|-
|Loss
|
|align=left| Eddie Mustafa Muhammad
|KO
|4
|26/08/1974
|align=left| Felt Forum, New York City, United States
|align=left|
|-
|Loss
|
|align=left| Bobby 'Boogaloo' Watts
|KO
|1
|15/07/1974
|align=left| Philadelphia Spectrum, Philadelphia, Pennsylvania, United States
|align=left|
|-
|Loss
|
|align=left| Willie "The Worm" Monroe
|UD
|10
|18/02/1974
|align=left| Philadelphia Spectrum, Philadelphia, Pennsylvania, United States
|align=left|
|-
|Win
|
|align=left| Al Quinney
|KO
|2
|12/11/1973
|align=left| Philadelphia Spectrum, Philadelphia, Pennsylvania, United States
|align=left|
|-
|Win
|
|align=left| Thurman "Doc" Holliday
|KO
|2
|06/08/1973
|align=left| Philadelphia Spectrum, Philadelphia, Pennsylvania, United States
|align=left|
|-
|Loss
|
|align=left| Jose "Monon" Gonzalez
|TKO
|9
|23/04/1973
|align=left| Philadelphia Arena, Philadelphia, Pennsylvania, United States
|align=left|
|-
|Loss
|
|align=left| Nate "Nat" Collins
|TKO
|8
|07/03/1972
|align=left| Philadelphia Arena, Philadelphia, Pennsylvania, United States
|align=left|
|-
|Win
|
|align=left| Matt "Art" Donovan
|KO
|2
|07/02/1972
|align=left| Philadelphia Arena, Philadelphia, Pennsylvania, United States
|align=left|
|-
|No Contest
|
|align=left| Denny Moyer
|NC
|6
|21/09/1971
|align=left| Philadelphia Spectrum, Philadelphia, Pennsylvania, United States
|align=left|
|-
|Win
|
|align=left| Fate Davis
|KO
|5
|10/08/1971
|align=left| Philadelphia Spectrum, Philadelphia, Pennsylvania, United States
|align=left|
|-
|Win
|
|align=left| Don Fullmer
|UD
|10
|22/06/1971
|align=left| Philadelphia Spectrum, Philadelphia, Pennsylvania, United States
|align=left|
|-
|Win
|
|align=left| Stanley "Kitten" Hayward
|TKO
|1
|03/05/1971
|align=left| Philadelphia Arena, Philadelphia, Pennsylvania, United States
|align=left|
|-
|Win
|
|align=left| Jim Meilleur
|TKO
|4
|22/03/1971
|align=left| Philadelphia Arena, Philadelphia, Pennsylvania, United States
|align=left|
|-
|Win
|
|align=left| Freddie Martinovich
|KO
|3
|26/01/1971
|align=left| The Blue Horizon, Philadelphia, Pennsylvania, United States
|align=left|
|-
|Win
|
|align=left| Jim J Davis
|KO
|4
|09/12/1970
|align=left| The Blue Horizon, Philadelphia, Pennsylvania, United States
|align=left|
|-
|Win
|
|align=left| Dave Dittmar
|KO
|5
|17/11/1970
|align=left| Philadelphia Spectrum, Philadelphia, Pennsylvania, United States
|align=left|
|-
|Win
|
|align=left| Humberto Trottman
|KO
|2
|02/11/1970
|align=left| Philadelphia Arena, Philadelphia, Pennsylvania, United States
|align=left|
|-
|Win
|
|align=left| Leroy "Hurricane" Roberts
|TKO
|4
|16/09/1970
|align=left| The Blue Horizon, Philadelphia, Pennsylvania, United States
|align=left|
|-
|Win
|
|align=left| Humberto Trottman
|KO
|5
|16/06/1970
|align=left| Philadelphia Arena, Philadelphia, Pennsylvania, United States
|align=left|
|-
|Win
|
|align=left| John "Wildcat" Saunders
|TKO
|4
|26/05/1970
|align=left| Fournier Hall, Wilmington, Delaware, United States
|align=left|
|-
|Win
|
|align=left| Sonny Floyd
|KO
|1
|18/05/1970
|align=left| The Blue Horizon, Philadelphia, Pennsylvania, United States
|align=left|
|-
|Win
|
|align=left| Vernon Mason
|KO
|3
|07/04/1970
|align=left| The Blue Horizon, Philadelphia, Pennsylvania, United States
|align=left|
|-
|Win
|
|align=left| John "Wildcat" Saunders
|KO
|3
|25/03/1970
|align=left| The Blue Horizon, Philadelphia, Pennsylvania, United States
|align=left|
|-
|Win
|
|align=left| Gene Masters
|KO
|1
|25/02/1970
|align=left| The Blue Horizon, Philadelphia, Pennsylvania, United States
|align=left|
|-
|Win
|
|align=left|"Country" Joe Williams
|KO
|1
|27/01/1970
|align=left| The Blue Horizon, Philadelphia, Pennsylvania, United States
|align=left|
|-
|Win
|
|align=left| Sam Mosley
|KO
|1
|13/01/1970
|align=left| The Blue Horizon, Philadelphia, Pennsylvania, United States
|align=left|
|-
|Win
|
|align=left| Art "The Dart" Kettles
|TKO
|3
|09/12/1969
|align=left| The Blue Horizon, Philadelphia, Pennsylvania, United States
|align=left|
|-
|Win
|
|align=left| "Big" Al Thomas
|KO
|2
|11/11/1969
|align=left| The Blue Horizon, Philadelphia, Pennsylvania, United States
|align=left|
|-
|Win
|
|align=left| Sonny Gravely
|KO
|1
|14/10/1969
|align=left| The Blue Horizon, Philadelphia, Pennsylvania, United States
|align=left|
|-
|Win
|
|align=left| Sheldon Moore
|KO
|1
|30/09/1969
|align=left| The Blue Horizon, Philadelphia, Pennsylvania, United States
|align=left|
|}

References

External links
 

1951 births
Living people
Middleweight boxers
American male boxers